Bankomatt is a 1989 Italian-Swiss drama film directed by Villi Hermann. It was entered into the 39th Berlin International Film Festival. The story follows a man planning and conducting a bank robbery. It is revealed he was formerly an employee of the bank, and is acting out of disgruntlement towards the current boss.

Cast
 Bruno Ganz as Bruno
 Giovanni Guidelli as Stefano
 Francesca Neri as Maria
 Omero Antonutti as Ernesto Soldini
 Pier Paolo Capponi as Impiegato banca
 Roberto De Francesco as Amico di Stefano
 Fabrizio Cerusico
 Andrea Novicov
 Renata Pozzi
 Tatiana Winteler

References

External links
 

1989 films
1989 crime drama films
1980s heist films
Italian crime drama films
Italian heist films
Swiss crime drama films
1980s Italian-language films
Films directed by Villi Hermann
1980s Italian films